The High Commissioner of the United Kingdom to Mauritius is the United Kingdom's foremost diplomatic representative to the Republic of Mauritius, and head of the UK's diplomatic mission in Mauritius.

The High Commissioner to Mauritius is also non-resident ambassador to the Union of the Comoros.

List of heads of mission

High Commissioners to Mauritius
1968–1970: Arthur Wooller
1970–1973: Peter Carter
1973–1977: Henry Brind
1977–1981: Alec Ward
1981–1985: James Allan
1986–1989: Richard Crowson
1989–1993: Michael Howell
1993–1997: John Harrison
1997–2000: James Daly
2001–2004: David Snoxell
2004–2007: Anthony Godson
2007–2010: John Murton
2010–2014: Nicholas Leake
2014–2017: Jonathan Drew

2017-2021: Keith Allan
2021-present: Charlotte Pierre

References

External links
Mauritius and the UK, gov.uk

Mauritius
 
United Kingdom